The On Gong Formation is a Mesozoic geologic formation in China. Dinosaur remains diagnostic to the genus level are among the fossils that have been recovered from the formation.

Paleofauna
 Mongolosaurus haplodon

See also

 List of dinosaur-bearing rock formations
 List of stratigraphic units with few dinosaur genera

Footnotes

References
 Weishampel, David B.; Dodson, Peter; and Osmólska, Halszka (eds.): The Dinosauria, 2nd, Berkeley: University of California Press. 861 pp. .

Lower Cretaceous Series of Asia